Sara Chafak (born 25 October 1990) is a Finnish beauty pageant winner of Moroccan origin who was crowned Miss Finland 2012 and represented Finland in Miss Universe 2012.

Early life
Chafak was born on 25 October 1990 in Helsinki, Finland, to a Moroccan Berber father and a Finnish mother. In 2011, she was crowned the 1st runner-up in the Miss Helsinki pageant.

Pageants

Miss Finland 2012
Chafak was crowned Miss Suomi 2012 (Miss Finland 2012) at the Vanajanlinna Castle in Hämeenlinna in southern Finland on 29 January 2012.

Miss Universe 2012
Chafak participated in the 61st edition of the Miss Universe pageant. She competed to succeed outgoing titleholder Leila Lopes from Angola.

Other
In autumn 2013 Chafak participated in the Finnish version of Dancing on Ice where ten celebrities (Sauli Koskinen among others) learned to ice skate with a professional partner. She was partnered with ice dancer Sasha Palomäki and they placed third in the final standings. In July 2014 Chafak made her debut as a rap artist on a JVG music video. In late 2014, Chafak competed in a poker tournament, bluffing professional poker pro Ronnie Bardah on the PokerStars-produced show Shark Cage. A clip of the bluff went viral.

References

External links
Official Miss Suomi website
 Slpash Celebrity News

1990 births
Living people
Miss Finland winners
Models from Helsinki
Miss Universe 2012 contestants
Finnish people of Moroccan-Berber descent